This is a list of mountain ranges on Earth and a few other astronomical bodies. First, the highest and longest mountain ranges on Earth are listed, followed by more comprehensive alphabetical lists organized by continent. Ranges in the oceans and on other celestial bodies are listed afterwards.

Mountain ranges on planet Earth

By height

Note 1:  A peak included in the "Eastern Pamirs" more often than in the Kunlun Mountains, as Kongur Tagh and the Kunlun range are separated by the large Yarkand River valley; no valley of such significance separates the Pamirs and Kongur Tagh, just political boundaries.

Note 2: Part of Hindu Kush-Himalayas region

All of the Asian ranges above have been formed in part over the past 35 to 55 million years by the collision between the Indian Plate and Eurasian Plate. The Indian Plate is still particularly mobile and these mountain ranges continue to rise in elevation every year and this page may need to be updated in a few years; of these the Himalayas are rising most quickly; the Kashmir and Pamirs region to the north of the Indian subcontinent is the point of confluence of these mountains which encircle the Tibetan Plateau.

By prominence
See List of peaks by prominence (ranking the mountain ranges as well).

Mountain ranges by length

Mountain systems, Himalayan ranges and chains by length (over 500 km):
The underwater Mid-ocean ridge – 
Ring of Fire – 
American Cordillera – 
Andes – . Northern and Southern Andes main subdivisions, along both run three vast, almost parallel chain systems of mountain ranges – Cordillera Occidental, Cordillera Central and Cordillera Oriental.
North American Cordillera – 
Alpine-Himalayan orogenic belt – more than 
Hindu Kush-Himalayas region – 
Great Escarpment, Southern Africa – 
Drakensberg – 
Rocky Mountains –  (section of the North American Cordillera)
Great Dividing Range – 
Transantarctic Mountains – 
Kunlun Mountains –  (section of the Alpine-Himalayan orogenic belt)
Atlas Mountains –  (section of the Alpine-Himalayan orogenic belt)
Ural Mountains – 
Appalachian Mountains – 
Himalayas – c. (main section of the Hindu Kush-Himalayas region)
High Himalayas – 
Sivalik Hills – 
Lesser Himalayas – 
Altai mountain system – 
New Guinea Highlands – 
Barisan Mountains – c.  (section of the Alpine-Himalayan orogenic belt)
Carpathian Mountains –  (section of the Alpine-Himalayan orogenic belt)
Scandinavian Mountains (Scandes) – c. 
Verkhoyansk Range-Suntar-Khayata Range –  (section of the East Siberian System of mountains) 
Verkhoyansk Range – 
Suntar-Khayata Range – 
Coast Mountains –  (section of the North American Cordillera)
Qin Mountains – 
Transhimalaya –  (section of the Alpine-Himalayan orogenic belt)
Western Ghats – 
Chersky Range –  (section of the East Siberian System of mountains)
Peninsular mountain ranges –  (section of the North American Cordillera)
Serra do Mar – 
Taurus Mountains –  (section of the Alpine-Himalayan orogenic belt)
Zagros Mountains –  (section of the Alpine-Himalayan orogenic belt)
Sierra Madre Occidental –  (section of the North American Cordillera)
Mantiqueira Mountains/Espinhaço Mountains – 
Kolyma Mountains –  (section of the East Siberian System of mountains)
Alps –  (section of the Alpine-Himalayan orogenic belt)
Western Alps – approx. 
French Prealps – more than 
Eastern Alps – approx. 
Central Eastern Alps – approx. 
Northern Limestone Alps – approx. 
Southern Limestone Alps and Western Limestone Alps – approx. 
Apennines –  (section of the Alpine-Himalayan orogenic belt)
Caucasus Mountains –  (section of the Alpine-Himalayan orogenic belt)
Greater Caucasus – 
Lesser Caucasus – 
Cordillera Occidental (Colombia) –  (section of the Northern Andes, American Cordillera)
Cordillera Oriental (Colombia) –  (section of the Northern Andes, American Cordillera)
Vindhya Range – 
Altai Mountains – 1,200 km (750 mi)
Drakensberg – 
Byrranga Mountains – 
Cascade Range – 
Annamite Range – 
Brooks Range –  (section of the North American Cordillera)
Verkhoyansk Range –  (section of the East Siberian Mountains)
Cordillera Central (Colombia) –  (section of the Northern Andes, American Cordillera)
Lena Plateau –  (section of the East Siberian System of mountains)
Pontic Mountains –  (section of the Alpine-Himalayan orogenic belt)
Eastern Sayan Mountains – 
Sierra Madre del Sur –  (section of the North American Cordillera)
Arakan/Rakhine Mountains – 
Hengduan Mountains –  as a system of mountain ranges
Ogo Mountains – 900 km (560 mi)
Koryak Mountains –  (Siberia)
Cape Fold Belt – 
Hindu Kush –  (section of the Hindu Kush-Greater Himalayas region)
Precordillera –  (considered section of the Southern Andes, American Cordillera)
Dzhugdzhur Mountains – 
Stanovoy Highlands –  (section of the East Siberian System of mountains)
Aravalli Range – 
Alaska Range –  (section of the North American Cordillera)
Kopet Mountains –  (section of the Alpine-Himalayan orogenic belt)
Sette-Daban –  (section of the East Siberian System of mountains)
Dinaric Mountains –  (section of the Alpine-Himalayan orogenic belt)
Sierra Nevada (U.S.) –  (section of the North American Cordillera)
California Coast Ranges –  (section of the North American Cordillera)
Balkan Mountains –  (section of the Alpine-Himalayan orogenic belt)
Karakoram –  (section of the Hindu Kush-Greater Himalayas region)
Southern Alps / Kā Tiritiri o te Moana – 
Yudoma-Maya Highlands –  (section of the East Siberian System of mountains)

By continental area

Africa 
Aberdare ranges, Kenya
Ahaggar Mountains
Ahmar Mountains
Amaro Mountains, Ethiopia
Atlantika Mountains, Cameroon, Nigeria
Atlas Mountains, Algeria, Morocco, Tunisia
Anti-Atlas, Morocco
Aurès Mountains, Algeria, Tunisia
High Atlas, Morocco
Middle Atlas, Morocco
Rif, Morocco
Saharan Atlas, Algeria
Tell Atlas, Algeria, Morocco, Tunisia
Bale Mountains, Ethiopia
Bakossi Mountains, Cameroon
Blue Mountains, Niger
Bvumba Mountains, Mozambique, Zimbabwe
Cal Madow, Somalia
Cederberg, South Africa
Drakensberg, Lesotho, South Africa
Eastern Arc Mountains, Kenya, Tanzania
Eastern Highlands, Mozambique, Zimbabwe
Entoto Mountains, Ethiopia
Erta Ale Range, Ethiopia
Golis Mountains, Somalia
Khufleh Range, Somalia
Kilimanjaro and Meru, Tanzania
Kipengere Range, Tanzania
Lebombo Mountains, Mozambique
Magaliesberg, South Africa
Mahale Mountains, Tanzania
Mandara Mountains, Cameroon, Nigeria
Moka Range, Mauritius
Ogo Mountains, Somalia
Outeniqua, South Africa
Pare Mountains, Tanzania
Piton des Neiges – Piton de la Fournaise, Réunion
Rwenzori, Uganda
Semien, Ethiopia
Swartberg, South Africa
Tadrat Acacus, Libya
Tibesti Mountains 
Udzungwa Mountains, Tanzania
Uluguru Mountains, Tanzania
Usambara Mountains, Tanzania

Asia 

Alagalla Mountain Range, Sri Lanka
Alborz, Iran
Al Hajar Mountains, Oman, United Arab Emirates
Altai Mountains, Russia, China, Mongolia, Kazakhstan
Annamite Range, Laos, Viet Nam
Anti-Lebanon, Lebanon, Syria, Palestine
Aravalli Range, India
Asir Mountains, Saudi Arabia
Barisan Mountains, Indonesia
Caraballo Mountains, Philippines
Cardamom Mountains, Cambodia
Carmel Mountains, Israel
Caucasus, Russia, Georgia, Azerbaijan, Armenia, Turkey
Chersky Range, Russia
Chittagong Hill Tracts, Bangladesh
Cordillera Central, Philippines
Crocker Range, Malaysia
Dieng Volcanic Complex, Indonesia
Dzhugdzhur Mountains, Russia
Eastern Ghats, India
Fansipan, Vietnam
Haraz Mountains, Yemen
Hijaz Mountains
Himalaya, Nepal, Bhutan, China, India, Pakistan
Mahabharat Range or Lesser Himalaya
Siwalik Range or Churia Hills, Subhimalaya
Hindu Kush, Afghanistan, Pakistan
Japanese Alps, Japan
Akaishi Mountains
Hida Mountains
Kiso Mountains
Judaean Mountains, Palestine, Israel
Kabir Kuh, Iran, Iraq
Karakoram, Pakistan, China, India
Khingan Mountains, China, Russia
Greater Khingan
Lesser Khingan
Khibinsky Mountains, Russia
Kirthar Mountains, Pakistan
Knuckles Mountain Range, Sri Lanka
Kolyma Mountains Russia
Koryak Mountains Russia
Kunlun Mountains, China (Tibet) 
Kuray Mountains, Russia
Mount Lebanon Range, Lebanon
Müller Mountains, Central Borneo, Indonesia
Pamir Mountains, Tajikistan, Kyrgyzstan, Afghanistan, China
Phnom Kulen, Cambodia
Phnom Voar, Cambodia
Safed Koh, Afghanistan, Pakistan
Salt Range, Pakistan
Sayan Mountains, Russia
Sivalik Hills range of outer Himalayas, India
Sierra Madre, Philippines
Sikhote Alin Mountains, Russia
Stanovoi Range, Russia
Sudirman Range, Indonesia
Sulaiman Mountains, Pakistan, Iran
Ta Kream Mountain Range, Cambodia
Taurus Mountains, Turkey
Toba Kakar Range, Afghanistan, Pakistan
Tian Shan, China, Kazakhstan, Kyrgyzstan
Taiwan Mountains, Taiwan
Tengger Mountains, Indonesia
Titiwangsa Mountains, Malaysia
Ural Mountains, Russia
Verkhoyansk Range, Russia
Western Ghats, India
Zagros Mountains, Iran, Iraq
Zambales Mountains, Philippines
Zamboanga Cordilleras, Philippines

Europe 

Alps
Eastern Alps, Austria, Germany, Italy, Liechtenstein, Slovenia, Switzerland
Central Eastern Alps, Austria, Italy, Slovenia, Switzerland
Bergamo Alps, Italy
Hohe Tauern, Austria, Italy
Ankogel Group
Defereggen Mountains
Grossglockner
Goldberg Group
Granatspitz Group
Hafner Group
Kreuzeck Group
Rieserferner Group
Schober Group
Venediger Group
Kitzbühel Alps, Austria
Niedere Tauern, Austria
Ötztal Alps, Austria, Italy
Rhaetian Alps, Austria, Italy, Switzerland
Albula Range
Bernina Range
Bregaglia Range
Livigno Range
Oberhalbstein Range
Plessur Range
Samnaun Alps
Sesvenna Range
Silvretta
Rätikon, Austria, Liechtenstein, Switzerland
Stubai Alps, Austria, Italy
Tux Alps, Austria
Verwall Alps, Austria
Zillertal Alps, Austria, Italy
Northern Limestone Alps, Austria, Germany
Allgäu Alps, Austria, Germany
Berchtesgaden Alps, Austria, Germany
Dachstein, Austria
Ennstaler Alpen, Austria
Karwendel, Austria, Germany
Lechtal Alps, Austria
Totes Gebirge, Austria
Wetterstein, Austria, Germany
Wilden Kaiser, Austria
Southern Limestone Alps, Austria, Italy, Slovenia, Switzerland
Adamello-Presanella, Italy
Brenta Group, Italy
Carnic Alps, Austria, Italy
Dolomites, Italy
Julian Alps, Italy, Slovenia
Kamnik Alps, Austria, Slovenia
Karawanken, Austria, Slovenia
Ortler Alps, Italy, Switzerland
Western Alps (France, Italy, and Switzerland)
Bernese Alps, Switzerland
Cottian Alps, France, Italy
Glarus Alps, Switzerland
Graian Alps, France, Italy, Switzerland
Mont Blanc Group, France, Italy
Beaufortain Massif, France
Vanoise, France
Gran Paradiso, France, Italy
Lepontine Alps, Italy, Switzerland
Ligurian Alps, France, Italy
North-Eastern Swiss Alps, Switzerland
Pennine Alps, Italy, Switzerland
Dauphiné Alps, France
Maritime Alps, France, Italy
Prealps, France, Italy
Provence Prealps, France
Dentelles de Montmirail, France
Savoy Prealps, France
Savoie Alps, France Switzerland
Urner Alps, Switzerland
Apennines, Italy, San Marino
Balkan Mountains range, mainly Bulgaria, smaller part in Serbia
Central Balkan Mountains
Kaloferska Mountain, Botev Peak, Central Balkan Mountains, Bulgaria
Zlatishko-Tetevenska Mountain, Bulgaria
Western Balkan Mountains
Chiprovska Mountain
Berkovska Mountain, Bulgaria
Vrachanski Balkan, Bulgaria
Black Forest, Germany
Cantabrian Mountains, Spain
Picos de Europa
Basque Mountains
Carpathian Mountains, Czech Republic, Hungary, Poland, Romania, Serbia, Slovakia, Ukraine
Western Carpathians
Tatra Mountains, Poland, Slovakia
Western Beskids and Central Beskids
Eastern Carpathians
Bieszczady Mountains
Otryt
Lower Beskids
Eastern Beskids
Moldavian-Muntenian Carpathians
Southern Carpathians
Făgăraș Mountains group
Retezat-Godeanu Mountains group
Poiana Ruscă Mountains
Banat Mountains
Apuseni Mountains
Bihor Mountains
Caucasus Mountains, Armenia, Azerbaijan, Georgia, Russia
Bezengi Wall, Georgia
Dinaric Alps, Albania, Bosnia and Herzegovina, Croatia, Montenegro, North Macedonia, Serbia, Slovenia
Prokletije
Skanderbeg Range, Albania
Gennargentu, Italy
Harz, Germany
Ireland mountains
MacGillycuddy's Reeks, Ireland
Wicklow Mountains, Ireland
Mourne Mountains, Northern Ireland
Sperrin Mountains, Northern Ireland
Jura mountains, France, Switzerland
Karelides, Finland
Lake District, England
Măcin Mountains, Romania
Massif Central, France
Olympus Range
Mount Olympus
Owl Mountains
Ore Mountains (Erzgebirge), Czech Republic, Germany
Pennines, England
Pindus Mountains, mainly Greece, smaller parts in Albania
Pyrenees, Andorra, France, Spain
Rila-Rhodope mountain massif, mainly Bulgaria, North Macedonia, Greece
Rila, Bulgaria
Pirin, Bulgaria
Slavyanka (mountain)
Osogovo-Belasitsa mountain range
Osogovo
Belasitsa
Vlahina
Malashevska mountain
Plačkovica
Ogražden
Rhodope Mountains, mainly Bulgaria, Greece 
Western Rhodopes
Eastern Rhodopes
Rhön Mountains, Germany
Šar range, Albania, Kosovo, North Macedonia
Šar Mountains
Mount Korab
Mount Bistra
Stogovo
Dešat
Jablanica
Galičica
Scandinavian Mountains, Finland, Norway, Sweden
Setesdalsheiene
Jotunheimen
Rondane
Dovrefjell
Trollheimen
Kjolen mountains 
Saltfjellet
Svecofennides
Lyngen Alps
Scottish Highlands
Grampian mountains, Scotland
Ben Nevis
Cairngorms, Scotland
The Cuillins, Isle of Skye
Sierra Morena, Spain
Sistema Bético, Spain
Sistema Central, Portugal, Spain
Sierra de Guadarrama
Sistema Ibérico, Spain
Srednogorie mountain system, Bulgaria
Vitosha, Bulgaria
Sredna Gora, Bulgaria
Strandzha, Bulgaria, Turkey
Świętokrzyskie Mountains, Poland
Sudetes, Czech Republic, Germany, Poland
Ślęża Masiff
Lusatian Mountains
Ještěd ridge
Jizera Mountains
Kaczawskie Mountains
Krkonoše
Rudawy Janowickie
Krkonoše foothills
Wałbrzyskie Mountains
Stone Mountains
Owl Mountains
Bardzkie Mountains
Stołowe Mountains
Orlicke Mountains
Bystrzyckie Mountains
Golden Mountains
Śnieżnik Mountains
Opawskie Mountains
Hrubý Jeseník
Low Jeseník
Šumava, Austria, Czech Republic, Germany
Swabian Alb, Germany
Serra de Tramuntana, Spain
Ural Mountains, Russia
Vogelsberg Mountains, Germany
Vosges mountains, France
Wales mountains
Black Mountains
Brecon Beacons
Snowdonia
West Vardar/Pelagonia mountain range, North Macedonia, Greece
Baba Mountain
Jakupica
Nidže
Kožuf

North America

Greenland

Alángup Qáqai
Alexandrine Range
Amitsorssûp Qulâ
Barth Range
Brages Range
Crown Prince Frederick Range
Daly Range
Didrik Pining Range
Ejnar Mikkelsen Range 
Ellemands Range
Fynske Alps
Giesecke Range
Graah Mountains
Gronau Nunataks
Grønne Range
H. H. Benedict Range
Halle Range
Haug Range
Heywood Range
Hjelm Range
Kangerluluk Range
Knud Rasmussen Range
Lacroix Range
Lemon Range
Lilloise Range
Lindbergh Range
Mols Range
Murchison Range
Musk Ox Mountains
Norlund Alps
Pentamerus Range
Pictet Range
Prince of Wales Range
Princess Caroline Mathilde Alps
Princess Elizabeth Alps
Qârusuit Range
Qivssakatdlagfik
Queen Louise Land
Rold Range
Roosevelt Range
Schweizerland
Sioraq Range (Sioraq Fjelde)
Stauning Alps
Svinhufvud Range
Tågefjeldene
Watkins Range
Wiedemann Range

Canada
Adam Range
Adamant Range
Alsek Ranges, British Columbia, Alaska, Yukon
Anvil Range, Yukon
Arctic Cordillera, northeastern Canada
Geodetic Hills
Asulkan Range
Badshot Range
Baffin Mountains
Battle Range
Beaufort Range
Big Bend Ranges, British Columbia
Big Salmon Range, Yukon
Blackwelder Mountains
Blue Mountains
Bonanza Range
Bonnet Plume Range, Yukon
Bonnington Range
Britannia Range
British Empire Range
British Mountains, Yukon
Bruce Mountains
Byam Martin Mountains
Cadwallader Range
Camelsfoot Range
Cameron Range
Canadian Rockies
Cantilever Range
Cariboo Mountains
Cascade Range
Cayoosh Range
Challenger Mountains
Chilcotin Ranges
Clachnacudainn Range
Clendinning Range
Cloister Mountains
Coast Mountains, Alaska, Yukon, British Columbia
Columbia Mountains, Canada and U.S.
Conger Range
Coquitlam Range
Crease Range
Cunningham Mountains
Dawson Range
Dickson Range
Douglas Ranges
Douro Range
Duncan Ranges
Elk River Mountains
Everett Mountains
Fannin Range
Franklin Range
Garfield Range
Garibaldi Ranges
Genevieve Range
Glenyon Range, Yukon
Goat Range
Gowlland Range
Grinnell Range
Grogan Morgan Range
Haddington Range
Haihte Range
Ha-Iltzuk Icefield
Halifax Range
Hankin Range
Hartz Mountains (Nunavut)
Hermit Range
Hess Mountains, Yukon
Homathko Icefield
Ilgachuz Range
Inglefield Mountains
Innuitian Mountains
Insular Mountains, British Columbia
Itcha Range
Jeffries Range
Joy Range
Karmutzen Range
Kaumajet Mountains, Labrador, Canada
Kettle River Range, Washington and British Columbia
Kiglapait Mountains, Labrador
Kitimat Ranges
Kluane Ranges, Yukon
Knorr Range, Yukon
Kokanee Range
Kootenay Ranges, British Columbia
Vermilion Range
Stanford Range
Beaverfoot Range
Krag Mountains
Krieger Mountains
Lardeau Range
Lillooet Icecap
Lillooet Ranges
Long Range Mountains, Newfoundland
MacDonald Range, British Columbia
McKay Range
Monashee Mountains, British Columbia and Washington
Nadaleen Range, Yukon
Nelson Range
Newcastle Range
Niut Range
Norns Range
North Shore Mountains
Ogilvie Mountains
Osborn Range
Pelham Range
Pelly Mountains, Yukon
Pierce Range
Precipitous Mountains
Premier Range
Prince of Wales Mountains
Prince of Wales Range
Princess Margaret Range
Purity Range
Queen Charlotte Mountains, British Columbia
Quesnel Highland
Rainbow Range
Refugium Range
Richardson Mountains, Yukon
Rocky Mountains, western United States and Canada
Rocky Mountain Foothills, British Columbia and Alberta
Ruby Range
Saint Elias Mountains, southern Alaska, Yukon and British Columbia
San Christoval Range
Sawtooth Range (Nunavut)
Scoresby Hills
Selamiut Range
Selkirk Mountains, British Columbia, Idaho and Washington
Selwyn Mountains, Yukon
Seymour Range
Shulaps Range
Shuswap Highland
Sir Donald Range
Sir Sandford Range
Somerset Range
Sophia Range
Spearhead Range
Spectrum Range
St. Cyr Range, Yukon
Stokes Range
Sutton Range
Swiss Range
Tantalus Range
Thorndike Peaks
Tochquonyalla Range
Torngat Mountains, Labrador, Quebec
Treuter Mountains
United States Range
Valhalla Ranges
Valkyr Range
Vancouver Island Ranges, British Columbia
Victoria and Albert Mountains
Waddington Range
Wernecke Mountains, Yukon
Windy Range
Winston Churchill Range, Alberta

United States
Adirondack Mountains, New York
Alaska Range, Alaska
Aleutian Range, Alaska
Chigmit Mountains, Alaska
Neacola Mountains, Alaska
Amargosa Range, California
Appalachian Mountains, Eastern United States
Allegheny Mountains
Appalachian (Allegheny) Plateau
Catskill Mountains, New York
Blue Ridge Mountains
Great Smoky Mountains
Green Mountains, Vermont
Talladega Mountains, Alabama
White Mountains, New Hampshire
Arbuckle Mountains, Oklahoma
Bears Paw Mountains, Montana
Beaver Lake Mountains, Utah
Big Snowy Mountains, Montana
Black Hills, South Dakota and Wyoming
Black Mountains, Utah
Blue Mountains, Oregon and Washington
Brooks Range, northern Alaska
Baird Mountains, Alaska
Jade Mountains, Alaska
Davidson Mountains, Alaska
De Long Mountains, Alaska
Endicott Mountains, Alaska
Franklin Mountains, Alaska
Phillip Smith Mountains, Alaska
Romanzof Mountains, Alaska
Schwatka Mountains, Alaska
Shubelik Mountains, Alaska
Waring Mountains, Alaska
Bull Mountains, Montana
Capitan Mountains, New Mexico
Cascade Range, Western Canada and US
Castle Mountains, Montana
Cedar Mountains, Utah
Chalk Buttes, Montana
Chinati Mountains, Texas
Chisos Mountains, Texas
Chugach Mountains, Alaska
Granite Range, Alaska
Robinson Mountains, Alaska
Coast Mountains, Alaska, Yukon, British Columbia
Columbia Mountains, Canada and U.S.
Monashee Mountains, British Columbia and Washington
Kettle River Range, Washington and British Columbia
Purcell Mountains, British Columbia and Montana
Selkirk Mountains, British Columbia, Idaho and Washington
Coso Range, California
Cricket Mountains, Utah
Davis Mountains, Texas
Delamar Mountains, Nevada
Delaware Mountains, Texas
Desert Range, Nevada
Driftless Area, Wisconsin, Minnesota, Illinois, Iowa
Ocooch Mountains, Wisconsin
East Desert Range, Nevada
East Humboldt Range, Nevada
Franklin Mountains, Texas
Gila Mountains, Arizona
Guadalupe Mountains, Texas
Highwood Mountains, Montana
Huron Mountains, Michigan
Judith Mountains, Montana
Klamath Mountains, California and Oregon
Marble Mountains, California
Northern Yolla-Bolly Mountains, California
Salmon Mountains, California
Scott Mountains, California
Siskiyou Mountains, Oregon and California
Trinity Alps, California
Trinity Mountains, California
Lake Range, Nevada
Little Rocky Range, Montana
Little Snowy Mountains, Montana
Little Wolf Mountains, Montana
Metacomet Ridge, Connecticut and Massachusetts
Traprock Ridge, Connecticut
Mineral Mountains, Arizona
Mineral Mountains, Utah
Nulato Hills, Alaska
North Moccasin Mountains, Montana
Olympic Mountains, Washington
Oquirrh Mountains, Utah
Oregon Coast Range, Oregon
Organ Mountains, New Mexico
Ortiz Mountains, New Mexico
Pahranagat Range, Nevada
Panamint Range, California
Pavant Range, Utah
Peninsular Ranges, California and México
Laguna Mountains, California
San Jacinto Mountains, California
Santa Ana Mountains, California
Elsinore Mountains
Temescal Mountains, California
Pinaleno Mountains, Arizona
Porcupine Mountains, Western Upper Peninsula of Michigan
Pryor Mountains, Montana
Rocky Mountains, western United States and Canada
Absaroka Range, Montana and Wyoming
Beartooth Mountains, Montana and Wyoming
Bighorn Mountains, Montana and Wyoming
Bitterroot Range, Montana and Idaho
Beaverhead Mountains, Montana and Idaho
Bitterroot Mountains, Montana and Idaho
Centennial Mountains, Montana and Idaho
Coeur d'Alène Mountains, Montana and Idaho
Saint Joe Mountains, Idaho
Boise Mountains, Idaho
Boulder Mountains, Idaho
Boulder Mountains, Montana
Bridger Mountains, Wyoming
Bridger Range, Montana
Cabinet Mountains, Montana
Clearwater Mountains, Idaho
Crazy Mountains, Montana
Elk Mountains, Colorado
Elkhorn Mountains, Montana
Flathead Range, Montana
Front Range, Colorado
Gallatin Range, Montana
Garnet Range, Montana
Granite Mountains, Wyoming
Green Mountains, Wyoming
Gros Ventre Range, Wyoming
Henry Mountains, Utah
John Long Mountains, Montana
La Sal Mountains, Utah
Laramie Mountains, Wyoming
Lemhi Range, Idaho
Lewis Range, Montana
Livingston Range, Montana
Madison Range, Montana
Medicine Bow Mountains, Colorado and Wyoming
Snowy Range, Wyoming
Mosquito Range, Colorado
Owl Creek Mountains, Wyoming
Pioneer Mountains, Idaho
Pioneer Mountains, Montana
Red Mountains, Wyoming
Salish Mountains, Montana
Salmon River Mountains, Idaho
Salt River Range, Wyoming
San Juan Mountains, Colorado
Sangre de Cristo Mountains, Colorado and New Mexico
Sawatch Range, Colorado
Sawtooth Range, Idaho
Shoshone Range, Idaho
Smoky Mountains, Idaho
Soldier Mountains, Idaho
Swan Range, Montana
Tenmile Range, Colorado
Teton Range, Wyoming
Tobacco Root Mountains, Montana
Uinta Mountains, Utah, Colorado, and Wyoming
Wasatch Range, Utah
Bear River Mountains, Utah and Idaho
Washburn Range, Wyoming
White Cloud Mountains, Idaho
Whitefish Range, Montana and British Columbia
Wind River Range, Wyoming
Wyoming Range, Wyoming
Ruby Mountains, Nevada
Sacramento Mountains, New Mexico
Saint Elias Mountains, southern Alaska, Yukon and British Columbia
Brabazon Range, Alaska
Fairweather Range, Alaska
San Andres Mountains, New Mexico
San Francisco Mountains, Utah
San Francisco Peaks, Arizona
Sandia–Manzano Mountains, New Mexico
Manzano Mountains, New Mexico
Sandia Mountains, New Mexico
Sawtooth Mountains, Minnesota
Schell Creek Range, Nevada
Selenite Range, Nevada
Seward Peninsula ranges, Alaska
Bendeleben Mountains, Alaska
Darby Mountains, Alaska
Kigluaik Mountains, Alaska
York Mountains, Alaska
Sheep Range, Nevada
Shoshone Mountains, Nevada
Shoshone Range, Nevada
Sierra Nevada, California and Nevada
Snake Range, Nevada
South Moccasin Mountains, Montana
Spring Mountains, Nevada
Star Range, Utah
Superstition Mountains, Arizona
Sutter Buttes, California
Texas Hill Country, Texas
Toiyabe Range, Nevada
Transverse Ranges, California
Chalk Hills, California
Little San Bernardino Mountains, California
Pine Mountain Ridge, California
Puente Hills, California
San Bernardino Mountains, California
San Emigdio Mountains, California
San Gabriel Mountains, California
San Jose Hills, California
San Rafael Hills, California
San Rafael Mountains, California
Santa Monica Mountains, California
Santa Susana Mountains, California
Santa Ynez Mountains, California
Shandin Hills, California
Sierra Pelona Ridge, California
Simi Hills, California
Tehachapi Mountains, California
Topatopa Mountains, California
Tushar Mountains, Utah
U.S. Interior Highlands, Arkansas, Missouri, Oklahoma
Ouachita Mountains, Arkansas and Oklahoma
Ozark Plateau, Missouri, Arkansas, and Oklahoma
Boston Mountains, Arkansas
St. Francois Mountains, Missouri
Uwharrie Mountains, North Carolina
Virginia Mountains, Nevada
West Humboldt Range, Nevada
West Mountains, Idaho
White Mountains, Alaska
White Mountains, Arizona
White Mountains, California
Wichita Mountains, Oklahoma
Wolf Mountains, Montana

Mexico
Chiapas Highlands, Mexico
Peninsular Ranges, California and México
Sierra de Juarez, México
Sierra de la Giganta, México
Sierra de la Laguna, México
Sierra de San Borja, México
Sierra de San Francisco, México
Sierra San Pedro Martir, Baja California, México
Sierra Madre de Chiapas, México, Guatemala, Honduras, and El Salvador
Sierra Madre del Sur, México
Sierra Madre Occidental, México
Sierra Fría, Mexico
Sierra los Huicholes, México
Sierra de Morones, Mexico
Sierra Tarahumara, México
Sierra Madre Oriental, México
Sierra del Burro, México
Sierra del Carmen, México
Sierra Norte de Puebla, México
Sierra de Tamaulipas, Mexico
Trans-Mexican Volcanic Belt (Sierra Nevada), México
Tuxtla Mountains, México

Central America 
Cerros de Escazú, Costa Rica
Cordillera de Guanacaste, Costa Rica
Cordillera de Talamanca, Costa Rica and Panamá
Cordillera de Tilarán, Costa Rica
Cordillera Isabelia, Nicaragua, Honduras
Cordillera Los Maribios, Nicaragua
Cordillera Central, Costa Rica
Maya Mountains, Belize
Sierra de Chinajá, Guatemala
Sierra de Chuacús, Guatemala
Sierra de los Cuchumatanes, Guatemala
Sierra del Merendón, Guatemala and Honduras
Sierra Madre de Chiapas, México, Guatemala, Honduras, and El Salvador

Caribbean 
Blue Mountains, Jamaica
Central Range, Trinidad and Tobago
Chaîne de la Selle, Haiti
Cordillera Central, Dominican Republic
Cordillera Septentrional, Dominican Republic
Cordillera Central, Puerto Rico
Dry Harbour Mountains, Jamaica
John Crow Mountains, Jamaica
Massif de la Hotte, Haiti
Massif du Nord, Haiti
Mocho Mountains, Jamaica
Montagnes Noires, Haiti
Northern Range, Trinidad and Tobago
Sierra de Baoruco, Dominican Republic
Sierra de Cayey, Puerto Rico
Sierra de Luquillo, Puerto Rico
Sierra del Escambray, Cuba
Sierra Maestra, Cuba
Sierra del Rosario, Cuba

South America

Andes
The longest mountain range in the world (above sea level) is the Andes, consisting of several subranges.
Cordillera de los Andes, in Argentina, Bolivia, Chile, Colombia, Ecuador, Peru and Venezuela:
Cordillera Central, Colombia
Cordillera Occidental, Colombia
Cordillera Oriental, Colombia, Venezuela 
Serranía del Perijá, Colombia, Venezuela
Serranía de los Churumbelos, Colombia
Cordillera Real, Ecuador
Cordillera Occidental, Ecuador
Cordillera Occidental, Peru
Cordillera Blanca, Peru
Cordillera Huayhuash, Peru
Cordillera Negra, Peru
Cordillera Central, Peru
Cordillera Oriental, Peru
Cordillera Central, Bolivia
Cordillera Real
Cordillera Oriental, Bolivia
Serranía de Charagua
Serranía del Aguaragüe
Cordillera Occidental, Bolivia, Chile
Cordillera de Lípez, Argentina, Bolivia
Cordillera de la Costa, Chile
Sierra Vicuña Mackenna
Cordillera de Talinay 
Cordillera de Nahuelbuta
Cordillera de Mahuidanchi
Cordillera Pelada
Cordillera del Sarao
Cordillera del Piuchén
Cordillera de Pirulil
Cordillera Domeyko, Chile
Cordón de Lila, Chile
Sierra de Almeida, Chile
Sierra de Famatina, Argentina
Frontal Cordillera, Argentina
Principal Cordillera, Argentina, Chile
Cordillera de la Ramada, Argentina
Sierra de Velasco, Argentina
Cordillera de Talinay, Chile
Cordillera Negra (Chile), Chile
Cordillera del Paine, Chile
Sierra Baguales, Argentina, Chile
Cordillera Sarmiento, Chile
Cordillera Riesco, Chile
Cordillera Darwin, Chile
Martial Mountains, Argentina
Dientes de Navarino, Chile

Extra-Andean mountain ranges
Other ranges in South America include:
Baudó Mountains, Colombia
Guiana Highlands, Brazil, Guyana, Venezuela
Serranías Chiquitanas, Bolivia
Serranías de Santiago
Serranía de Macuira, Colombia
Sierra Nevada de Santa Marta, Colombia
Serrania de la Macarena, Colombia
Serra dos Aimorés, Brazil
Borborema Plateau, Brazil
Chapada, Brazil
Chapada do Araripe, Brazil
Espinhaço Mountains, Brazil
Chapada dos Guimarães, Brazil
Chapada das Mangabeiras, Brazil
Mantiqueira Mountains, Brazil
Serra do Mar, Brazil
Serra do Cristal, Brazil
Serra Gaúcha, Brazil
Serra dos Órgãos, Brazil
Serra Geral, Brazil
Serra de Ibiapaba, Brazil
Serra do Rio do Rastro, Brazil
Serra do Tiracambu, Brazil
Ybytyruzú Mountains, Paraguay
Sierras de Córdoba, Argentina
Sierra de La Ventana, Argentina
Cordón Baquedano, Chile

Oceania

Australia
Arthur Range
Blue Mountains
Flinders Ranges
Great Dividing Range
Hammersley Range
MacDonnell Ranges
Pelion Range
Stirling Range

Indonesia
Jayawijaya Mountains, Western New Guinea
Arfak Mountains, Western New Guinea

New Zealand
Arrowsmith Range
Ben Ohau Range
Blue Mountains
Bombay Hills
Butler Range (Canterbury)
Butler Range (West Coast)
Cameron Mountains
Catlins Range
Coromandel Range
Craigieburn Range
Crown Range
Dark Cloud Range
Darran Mountains
Dunstan Mountains
Earl Mountains
Franklin Mountains
Glasgow Range
Hakarimata Range
Hapuakohe Range
Herangi Range
Huiarau Range
Humboldt Mountains
Hundalee Hills
Hunter Mountains
Hunua Ranges
Kā Mauka-Tokoweka
Kaikōura Ranges
Kaimai Range
Kaitake Range
Kakanui Range
Kākāpō Range
Kaweka Range
Kepler Mountains
Mount Cook Range
Lammerlaw Range
Lammermoor Range
Livingstone Mountains
Moehau Range
Murchison Mountains
Old Man Range / Kopuwai
Papahaua Range
Paparoa Range
Pisa Range
Port Hills
Pouakai Range
Rangitoto Range
Rock and Pillar Range
Spenser Mountains
Stuart Mountains
Raukūmara Range
Richmond Range
The Remarkables
Remutaka Range
Ruahine Range
The Silverpeaks
Southern Alps
Spenser Mountains
Hector Mountains
Tararua Range
Two Thumb Range
Waitākere Ranges
Wharepapa / Arthur Range
Wick Mountains

Papua New Guinea
Bismarck Range
Owen Stanley Range

Antarctica 
Allardyce Range, South Georgia
Imeon Range, Smith Island
Pensacola Mountains

Salvesen Range, South Georgia
Tangra Mountains, Livingston Island
Transantarctic Mountains
Queen Maud Mountains
Bush Mountains
Commonwealth Range
Dominion Range
Gothic Mountains
Green Range
Herbert Range
Prince Olav Mountains
Hughes Range
Supporters Range
Theron Mountains
Heimefront Range, Queen Maud Land
Borg Massif, Queen Maud Land
Fimbulheimen, Queen Maud Land
Gburek Peaks
Sverdrup Mountains
Gjelsvik Mountains
Mühlig-Hofmann Mountains
Orvin Mountains
Filchner Mountains
Drygalski Mountains
Kurze Mountains
Gagarin Mountains
Conrad Mountains
Wohlthat Mountains
Humboldt Mountains
Petermann Ranges
Gruber Mountains
Hoel Mountains
Weyprecht Mountains
Payer Mountains
Lomonosov Mountains
Sør Rondane Mountains, Queen Maud Land
Belgica Mountains, Queen Maud Land
Planet Heights
Queen Fabiola Mountains, Queen Maud Land
Aristotle Mountains, Graham Land
Pippin Peaks
Stribog Mountains, Brabant Island
Solvay Mountains, Brabant Island
Brugmann Mountains, Liège Island

Ocean
Emperor Seamounts
Mid-ocean ridge (the longest mountain range on Earth)
Gakkel Ridge
Mid-Atlantic ridge
Southwest Indian Ridge
Central Indian Ridge
Southeast Indian Ridge
Pacific-Antarctic Ridge
East Pacific Rise
Ninety East Ridge

Extraterrestrial mountain ranges

The Moon 

By IAU convention, lunar mountain ranges are given Latin names.
Montes Agricola
Montes Alpes
Montes Recti
Montes Retacule
Montes Riphaeus
Montes Rook
Montes Secchi
Montes Spitzbergen
Montes Taurus
Montes Teneriffe

Iapetus
Equatorial ridge

Mercury 

 Caloris Montes

Titan 

 Mithrim Montes

Pluto 

 Tenzing Montes

See also

Mountain
Mountain range
List of highest mountains
Seven Summits
List of mountains on the Moon
List of tallest mountains in the Solar System
List of mountains on Mars by height
Frontal Cordillera
Principal Cordillera

References

01
 
 01
.01
Mountain ranges